John Warren (September 6, 1874 – July 17, 1928) was a professor of anatomy at Harvard University, as well as its University Marshal.

Warren was the son and great-grandson of Harvard Medical School legends John Collins Warren Jr. and John Collins Warren (Sr.), and great-great-grandson of Harvard Medical School founder John Warren. He graduated from Harvard Medical School in 1900.

He was an assistant, then a Demonstrator, in Harvard's Anatomy Department, then Assistant Professor (190815) and finally Associate Professor from 1915 on.

In 1911 he was appointed Harvard's University Marshal.

Warren was coauthor of An Outline of Practical Anatomy (1924, with Alexander S. Begg), and author of Warren's Handbook of Anatomy (published posthumously, 1930).

References

External links

1874 births
1928 deaths
Harvard Medical School faculty
Harvard Medical School alumni